Dhakuria is a census town in Gaighata CD Block in Bangaon subdivision in North 24 Parganas district in the state of West Bengal, India.

Geography

Location
It is located in Gaighata community development block under Bangaon subdivision of North 24 Parganas district. This town is part of Gaighata Police Station.

Area overview
The area shown in the map was a part of Jessore district from 1883. At the time of Partition of Bengal (1947) the Radcliffe Line placed the police station areas of Bangaon and Gaighata of Jessore district in India and the area was made a part of 24 Parganas district. The renowned novelist, Bibhutibhushan Bandopadhyay (of Pather Panchali fame) belonged to this area and many of his writings portray his experience in the area. It is a flat plain located in the lower Ganges Delta. In the densely populated area, 16.33% of the population lives in the urban areas and 83.67% lives in the rural areas.

Note: The map alongside presents some of the notable locations in the subdivision. All places marked in the map are linked in the larger full screen map.

Demographics
As per 2011 Census of India Dhakuria had a total population of 10,165, of which 5,054 (50%) were males and 5,111 (50%) were females. Population below 6 years was 836. The total number of literates in Dhakuria was 7,849 (84.14% of the population over 6 years).

 India census, Dhakuria had a population of 8842. Males constitute 51% of the population and females 49%. Dhakuria has an average literacy rate of 71%, higher than the national average of 59.5%: male literacy is 76% and, female literacy is 65%. In Dhakuria, 12% of the population is under 6 years of age.

References

Cities and towns in North 24 Parganas district